The Seat of the Soul is a Canadian drama film, directed by Olivier Asselin and released in 1997. The film stars Emmanuel Bilodeau as Jules, a scientist in the late 19th century who sets out to prove the existence of the human soul after finding a mummy with its heart still beating.

The cast also includes Lucille Fluet as Sophie, a suicidal young woman with whom Jules falls in love, and Rémy Girard as a detective.

The film premiered in theatres in Quebec on September 1, 1997, and was screened at the 1997 Toronto International Film Festival.

The film received two Genie Award nominations at the 18th Genie Awards in 1998, for Best Overall Sound (Hans Peter Strobl, Daniel Bisson, Jo Caron and Marcel Chouinard) and Best Sound Editing (Myriam Poirier, Mathieu Beaudin, Jérôme Décarie and Jacques Plante).

References

External links

1997 films
1997 drama films
Canadian drama films
French-language Canadian films
Films directed by Olivier Asselin
1990s Canadian films